Siccia gypsia is a moth in the family Erebidae. It was described by George Hampson in 1914. It is found in the Democratic Republic of the Congo, Ghana and Kenya.

References

Moths described in 1914
Nudariina